The 2015–16 San Francisco Dons women's basketball team will represent the University of San Francisco in the 2015–16 college basketball season. It was head coach Jennifer Azzi's sixth season at San Francisco. The Dons, members of the West Coast Conference, play their home games at War Memorial Gymnasium. They finished the season 21–12, 9–9 in WCC play to finish in sixth place. They won the WCC women's tournament and earn automatic trip to NCAA women's tournament for the first time since 1997. They lost to Stanford in the first round.

On September 15, 2016, Azzi resigned as head coach of the Dons to pursue new career opportunities. She finished with a six-year record of 73–114.

Roster

Schedule and results

|-
!colspan=12 style="background:#006633; color:#FFCC33;"| Exhibition

|-
!colspan=9 style="background:#006633; color:#FFCC33;"| Non-conference regular season

|-
!colspan=9 style="background:#006633; color:#FFCC33;"| WCC regular season

|-
!colspan=9 style="background:#006633; color:#FFCC33;"| WCC Women's Tournament

|-
!colspan=9 style="background:#006633; color:#FFCC33;"| NCAA Women's Tournament

See also
2015–16 San Francisco Dons men's basketball team
San Francisco Dons women's basketball

References

San Francisco Dons women's basketball seasons
San Francisco
San Francisco
San Francisco Dons
San Francisco Dons